State Road 443 was a short state highway in West Lafayette, Indiana, less than 1.5 miles long.  It ran along Happy Hollow Road for its entire length.

Route description

State Road 443 departed from its parent route, State Road 43, just north of State Road 26 in West Lafayette.  While State Road 43 continues to the north-northeast, State Road 443 travelled north-northwest, ascending from the flood plain of the Wabash River past Happy Hollow Park to the level of the surrounding terrain where it connected with the former U.S. Route 52, serving as a connector between the two highways, which are grade-separated. Due to the realignment of US 52 to the west and south of West Lafayette in September 2013 with US 231, the route was removed in December 2013.

Major intersections

References

External links

443
Transportation in Tippecanoe County, Indiana